The Solar Handbag was designed in 2011 by Danish design company Diffus Design in collaboration with the Alexandra Institute and Center for Software Innovation.

The Solar Handbag has 100 silicon solar cells which collect daytime sunlight  and thus generate two watts of usable energy enough to charge a mobile device. The handbag also features a set of interior optical fibers that glow to assist the user in their search for objects in the handbag. The solar cells have been woven into conductive embroidery on the exterior surface of the handbag, which transmits the harvested energy into a rechargeable lithium ion battery. These components were developed through a joint research effect between Forster Rohner AG and the University of Applied Science Rapperswil and the NTB Interstate University of Applied Sciences of Technology, Buchs, Switzerland.

References

Bags (fashion)